is a Japanese actor. He graduated from Okinawa Prefecture Koza High School. He is represented with Humanitè.

Mitsushima's older sister is former Folder and Folder 5 member turned actress Hikari Mitsushima. His younger sister is model Minami Mitsushima. Mitsushima's younger brother is Kotaro Mitsushima, a basketball player for Rizing Zephyr Fukuoka of the Japan Basketball League.

Biography

After graduating from high school Mitsushima moved to Tokyo from Okinawa, he worked as an after-school childcare worker there, and became a production director for the film Be Sure to Share.

After living in Tokyo for about two years, he took a chance to cycle around Japan for seven months from May to November 2009. Mitsushima traveled around the country from Hokkaido to Kagoshima Prefecture. On the street, he saw posters, signboards, and magazines of a film in which his older sister appeared and realized that his sister "impressed a lot of people" and he has "to work hard as well", and came to aim for the way of acting. Later in December, Mitsushima joined to the office in which his sister has belonged.

In 2010, he made his acting debut as the lover of Tomoko Nakajima's character in Osorubeki Oya-tachi performed in the Tokyo Metropolitan Theatre.

Mitsushima made his starring debut in the film Zoku Ittara Jinsei Kawatta www released 9 November 2013.

He later married his sister Hikari's manager at the end of 2014.

In 2016, he voiced the main character Satoru Fujinuma in the anime television Erased in which he made his voice acting debut.

Filmography

TV dramas

Films

Stage

TV anime

Anime films

TV programmes

Radio programmes

Advertisements

Dubbing

Awards
 2012

References

External links
 – Humanitè 
Tokushū: Ano Hito no totte oki Selection: Shinnosuke Mitsushima-san NHK Archives 

Japanese male stage actors
Japanese people of French descent
Japanese people of American descent
People from Okinawa Prefecture
1989 births
Living people